Vestjøkulen is a glacier in Sørkapp Land at Spitsbergen, Svalbard. It is a tributary glacier to Samarinbreen, and is located west of the mountain ridge Bredichinryggen (with Austjøkulen at the opposite/eastern side of the ridge).

References

Glaciers of Spitsbergen